This is a list of MPs who lost their seat at the 2021 German federal election. All of these members sat in the 19th Bundestag but were not returned to Parliament in the elections.

Those listed include members who were elected in 2017 who lost their constituencies in 2021 and were not re-elected via state lists. Also included are List MPs who did not succeed on the second ballot.

Outlisted means the MP did not win a direct mandate, and also did not win a seat on the state list.

List

Notes

References

2021 elections in Germany
Lists of German MPs who were defeated by election